Brown Palace Hotel may refer to:
 Brown Palace Hotel (Denver, Colorado)
 Brown Palace Hotel (Mobridge, South Dakota)